Viktor Savchenko may refer to:
Viktor Grigoryevich Savchenko (b. 1948), Ukrainian Olympic hurdler
Viktor Grigorievich Savchenko (b. 1952), Ukrainian amateur middleweight boxer
Viktor Anatolyevich Savchenko (b. 1961), Ukrainian historian